The Pilgrim Trust is a national grant-making trust in the United Kingdom. It is based in London and is a registered charity under English law.

It was founded in 1930 with a two million pound grant by Edward Harkness, an American philanthropist. The trust's inaugural board were Stanley Baldwin, Sir James Irvine, Sir Josiah Stamp, John Buchan and Hugh Macmillan; its first secretary was former civil servant, Thomas Jones.

Preamble to Trust Deed

The preamble to the Trust Deed was written by John Buchan, and reads thus:

Recording Britain
In 1940 the Trust funded a scheme "Recording the changing face of Britain" established by the Committee for the Employment of Artists in Wartime, part of the Ministry of Labour and National Service. Led by Sir Kenneth Clark, director of the National Gallery, it employed artists to record the home front in Britain, running until 1943. It was motivated by a desire to record and reflect the landscape, already undergoing a period of rapid change through urbanisation and changes in agriculture and further threatened by bombing and other effects of war. Some of the sixty three artists directly commissioned included John Piper, Sir William Russell Flint, Charles Knight, Malvina Cheek, George Hooper, Clifford Ellis, Raymond Teague Cowern and Rowland Hilder. A further thirty four artists contributed to the final total of over 1500 works. The collection was donated to the Victoria and Albert Museum by the Trust in 1949. Over a hundred works comprising the "Recording Scotland" part of the same scheme are held at the Museum Collections Unit, University of St Andrews.

The Trust today

Today, the trust makes grants of roughly 2 million pounds each year.  Around 60% of these funds are given to preservation projects, particularly those aimed at preserving the fabric of architecturally or historically significant buildings, or those aimed at preserving historically interesting artifacts or documents.  The trust has a particular interest in the preservation of historic churches and their contents.  The remaining funds are allocated to social welfare causes, particularly projects which assist those misusing alcohol and drugs, and projects in prisons, including those that seek alternatives to custody. The trust is a principal contributor to the collaborative National Cataloguing Grants Scheme operated in conjunction with The National Archives.

Trustees

, the trustees of the Trust are:

Sir Mark Jones (chairman)
Michael Baughan
Professor Sir Colin Blakemore
Lady Riddell LVO
Sarah Staniforth CBE
Sir Alan Moses
Kevin Pakenham
John Podmore
James Fergusson
Caroline Butler
David Barrie CBE

References

External links
The Pilgrim Trust

Charities based in London
Heritage organisations in the United Kingdom
1930 establishments in the United Kingdom
Organisations based in the City of Westminster
Organizations established in 1930